Brattvær is a former municipality in Møre og Romsdal county, Norway.  The  municipality existed from 1915 until its dissolution in 1960.  It was located on the northwestern part of the island of Smøla in the present-day municipality of Smøla.  It included the area surrounding the villages of Råket and Dyrnes as well as the surrounding islets.  The Brattvær Church was the main church of the municipality.

History
The municipality of Brattvær was established on 1 January 1915 when the large municipality of Edøy was split into three to form the new municipalities of Edøy (population: 973), Brattvær (population: 1,462), and Hopen (population: 1,050).  During the 1960s, there were many municipal mergers across Norway due to the work of the Schei Committee. On 1 January 1960, the 1915 partition was reversed, reuniting the municipalities of Brattvær, Edøy, and Hopen as the new municipality of Smøla. Before the merger, Brattvær had a population of 1,361.

See also
List of former municipalities of Norway

References

Smøla
Former municipalities of Norway
1915 establishments in Norway
1960 disestablishments in Norway